Carcoforo is a comune (municipality) in the province of Vercelli in the Italian region Piedmont, located about  northeast of Turin and about  northwest of Vercelli.

Carcoforo borders the following municipalities: Alto Sermenza,  Bannio Anzino, Ceppo Morelli, Fobello and Macugnaga.

References

Cities and towns in Piedmont